In a prism, the angle of deviation decreases with increase in the angle of incidence up to a particular angle.

The angle of minimum deviation is related with the refractive index as:

This is useful to calculate the refractive index of a material. Rainbow and halo occur at minimum deviation. Also, a thin prism is always set at minimum deviation.

Formula

In minimum deviation, the refracted ray in the prism is parallel to its base. In other words, the light ray is symmetrical about the axis of symmetry of the prism. 
Also, the angles of refractions are equal i.e. . And, the angle of incidence and angle of emergence equal each other. This is clearly visible in the graph below.

The formula for minimum deviation can be derived by exploiting the geometry in the prism. The approach involves replacing the variables in the Snell's law in terms of the Deviation and Prism Angles by making the use of the above properties.

This can also be derived by putting  in the prism formula: 

From Snell's law,

This is a convenient way used to measure the refractive index of a material(liquid or gas) by directing a light ray through a prism of negligible thickness at minimum deviation filled with the material or in a glass prism dipped in it.

Worked out examples:

Answer: 37°, 49°

Solution:

Here, 

Plugging them in the above formula,

Also,

This is also apparent in the graph below.

Answer: 60°

Solution:

Here,

Using the above formula,

Finding the minima of this equation will also give the same relation for minimum deviation as above.

For thin prism

In a thin or small angle prism, as the angles become very small, the sine of the angle nearly equals the angle itself and this yields many useful results.

Interestingly, using a similar approach with the Snell's law and the prism formula for an in general thin-prism ends up in the very same result for the deviation angle.

From the prism formula,

Thus, it can be said that a thin prism is always in minimum deviation.

Experimental determination

Minimum deviation can be found manually or with spectrometer. Either the prism is kept fixed and the incidence angle is adjusted or the prism is rotated keeping the light source fixed.

Minimum angle of dispersion

The minimum angle of dispersion for white light is the difference in minimum deviation angle between red and violet rays of a light ray through a prism.

The difference in the deviation between red and violet light,  is called the Angular Dispersion produced by the prism.

Applications

One of the factors that causes a rainbow is the bunching of light rays at the minimum deviation angle that is close to the rainbow angle (42°).

It is also responsible for phenomena like halos and sundogs, produced by the deviation of sunlight in  mini prisms of hexagonal ice crystals in the air bending light with a minimum deviation of 22°.

See also

 Prism
 Refraction
 Geometrical optics

References

External links
 Minimum Deviation Part 1 and Part 2 at Khan Academy
 Refraction through a Prism in NCERT Tectbook
 Minimum Deviation by Prism by Mark A Peterson, Mount Holyoke College

Geometrical optics
Light